A photovoltaic keyboard is a wireless computer keyboard that charges its batteries from a light source such as the sun or interior lighting, addressing a major drawback of wireless computer peripherals that otherwise require regular replacement of discharged batteries.
The first keyboard that was solar-powered was Logitech K750 that was announced by the company in 2010. In 2018 Microsoft filed a patent describing how solar panels could be used to extend battery life for Microsoft's Surface Pro.

Logitech K750
The Logitech K750 has a set of photovoltaic cells on the top edge, charges from any light source including sunlight and under a standard bulb, can work up to three months in total darkness, and includes software to display battery charging status. It is a full-sized keyboard, including the usual movement keys and NumPad section on the right side, with low-profile keys much like a laptop.
There are two models, compatible with Windows or Macintosh operating systems.

Even though the keyboard is not officially supported in Linux, a third party application named Solaar provides functionality akin to the original Logitech software, such as battery and connection status indications, and allows device pairing/unpairing.

Logitech K760

Another Logitech keyboard, the K760, is also PV powered, is highly useful. It is smaller than the Logitech K750 and communicates with the computer via Bluetooth.

References

External links

 Logitech Wireless Solar Keyboard K750

Computer keyboards
Applications of photovoltaics